

Events
 Ashur-nirari V succeeds Ashur-Dan III as king of Assyria

Births

Deaths 
Aeschylus, King of Athens, dies after a reign of 23 years and is succeeded by Alcmaeon.

References

750s BC